The 1992 Greenlandic Men's Football Championship was the 22nd edition of the Greenlandic Men's Football Championship. The final round was held in Ilulissat. It was won by Aqigssiaq Maniitsoq for the first time in its history.

First round

Capital Region

Second round

Group A
Disko-76 and FC Malamuk qualified for the final Round.

Group B
Nagdlunguaq-48 qualified for the final Round.

Group C
Aqigssiaq Maniitsoq qualified for the final Round.

Group D

Group E

Final round

Pool 1

Pool 2

Playoffs

Semi-finals

Fifth-place match

Third place match

Final

See also
Football in Greenland
Football Association of Greenland
Greenland national football team
Greenlandic Men's Football Championship

References

Greenlandic Men's Football Championship seasons
Green
Green
Foot